Janice Rymer is professor of obstetrics and gynaecology at King's College London and consultant gynecologist at Guy's and St Thomas' NHS Foundation Trust. She is a vice president of the Royal College of Obstetricians and Gynaecologists.

References

British gynaecologists
Academics of King's College London
British women medical doctors
Living people
Year of birth missing (living people)